Coleopora is a genus of bryozoans belonging to the family Teuchoporidae.

The species of this genus are found in Northern America and Australia.

Species:

Coleopora americana 
Coleopora asanoi 
Coleopora gigantea 
Coleopora granulosa 
Coleopora insignis 
Coleopora seriata 
Coleopora tsugaruensis

References

Bryozoan genera